Dutch processed cocoa, Dutch cocoa, or alkalized cocoa, is cocoa solids that have been treated with an alkalizing agent to reduce the natural acidity of cocoa, giving it a less bitter taste (and darker colour) compared to "natural cocoa" extracted with the Broma process. It forms the basis for much of modern chocolate, and is used in ice cream, hot chocolate, and baking.

Alkalizing agents employed vary, but include potassium carbonate (E501), sodium carbonate (E500), and/or sodium hydroxide (E525).

Dutching greatly reduces the levels of certain phytochemicals in cocoa.

Nutrition

History 
The Dutch process was developed in the early 19th century by Dutch chocolate maker Coenraad Johannes van Houten, whose father Casparus was responsible for the development of the method of removing fat from cocoa beans by hydraulic press around 1828, forming the basis for cocoa powder. These developments greatly expanded the use of cocoa, which had been mostly used as a beverage in Europe until that time.

Colour 
The quantity of alkalizing agent is not specified on the ingredients on cocoa powder. However, this may be figured out by comparing the brown shades between different products. Higher quantities of alkalizing agents will produce cocoa that is darker than cocoa with lower quantities.

Taste and cooking properties 
Dutch processed cocoa has a neutral pH, and is not acidic like natural cocoa, so in recipes that use sodium bicarbonate (baking soda) as the leavening agent (which relies on the acidity of the cocoa to activate it), an acid must be added to the recipe, such as cream of tartar or the use of buttermilk instead of fresh milk. There is no need to add acidity when natural cocoa is used in recipes that use baking powder instead of soda for leavening.

Reduction of phytochemicals

Caffeine
Dutch cocoa contains 3 times less caffeine:
 100 grams unsweetened cocoa powder processed with alkali contains 78 mg.
 100 grams unsweetened cocoa powder without alkali contains 230 mg.

Antioxidants and flavonols
Compared to other processes, Dutch process cocoa contains lower amounts of flavonols (antioxidants). The effect this has on nutritional value is disputed.  Professor Irmgard Bitsch of the Institut für Ernährungswissenschaft, Justus-Liebig-University Giessen claims that the reduction of antioxidants due to the process is not significant and enough polyphenols and procyanidins remain in the cocoa. One study determined that 60% of natural cocoa's original antioxidants were destroyed by light dutching and 90% were destroyed by heavy dutching. Natural cocoa has such high levels of antioxidants that even a 60% reduction leaves it high on the list of antioxidant-rich foods.

References 

Dutch chocolate
Chocolate industry
Dutch cuisine
Dutch inventions
Industrial history of the Netherlands
Food powders